Miss Pinnegar Disappears is a 1952 mystery detective novel by Anthony Gilbert, the pen name of British writer Lucy Beatrice Malleson. It is the twenty sixth in her long-running series featuring the unscrupulous solicitor and detective Arthur Crook. Crook first appeared during the Golden Age of Detective Fiction, but the series ran for several decades. It was published in the United States under the alternative title A Case for Mr. Crook.

Synopsis
Crook meets Frances Pinnegar at a bus stop and after giving her a lift home offers her his card in case she ever needs his professional services. Miss Pinnegar is a respectable retired nurse so this hardly seems likely. However when trouble arises some months later she sends him an urgent phone message, but he gets there too late as she has already vanished.

References

Bibliography
 Magill, Frank Northen . Critical Survey of Mystery and Detective Fiction: Authors, Volume 2. Salem Press, 1988.
Murphy, Bruce F. The Encyclopedia of Murder and Mystery. Springer, 1999.
 Reilly, John M. Twentieth Century Crime & Mystery Writers. Springer, 2015.

1952 British novels
British mystery novels
British thriller novels
Novels by Anthony Gilbert
Novels set in England
British detective novels
William Collins, Sons books